Takashi Uchino (内野 貴志, born February 15, 1988) is a Japanese football player.

Club statistics
Updated to 23 February 2020.

References

External links
Profile at Nagano Parceiro

1988 births
Living people
Biwako Seikei Sport College alumni
Association football people from Shiga Prefecture
Japanese footballers
J2 League players
J3 League players
Japan Football League players
Kyoto Sanga FC players
AC Nagano Parceiro players
MIO Biwako Shiga players
Association football defenders
Universiade bronze medalists for Japan
Universiade medalists in football
Medalists at the 2009 Summer Universiade